Parche-Ji-Veri railway station 
() is  located in  Pakistan.

See also
 List of railway stations in Pakistan
 Pakistan Railways

References

External links

Railway stations in Pakistan